Max Lagarrigue, born in 1972 in Castelsarrasin, is a French historian specialising in rural communism and a journalist.

Biography 
Lagarrigue taught history of communism at the Institut d'Etudes Politiques de Paris and has published numerous papers including in the magazine Communism  published by the Study Group and Democracy Observatory (GEODE) of the National Center for Scientific Research and a book on the charismatic leader of French rural communism Renaud Jean entitled Notebooks a Communist deputy (2001).

Working alongside the history of the Second World War, it was also interested in the Exodus and the history of refugees in 1940. Organizer of an international symposium on this subject, he led a reference book titled 1940, The decline of France. The European defeat(in 2001). These investigations have also led to writing and directing a documentary (The decline of France, May 1940) and a book about the exodus of the Belgians in the Southwest of France (2005).

He also organized an international symposium titled Manuel Azana and memory of the Spanish Civil Warin November 2004 Montauban) working to preserve the memory of President of the Spanish Republic, Manual Azaña, a refugee who was buried in Montauban in November 1940. He co-founded in 2005, with actor and director François-Henri Soulié, the association "Présence de Manuel Azaña".  which was established to hold an annual celebration on the date of death of the President of the Spanish Republic.

Wishing to promote regional contemporary history, he co-founded an association called Montauban  Arkheia - History, memory of the twentieth century in South-West, which publishes a magazine of the same name. This review brings together a group of historians, academics, journalists, local scholars, teachers and students.

He is also since 2001 a journalist by involving local (Journal du Palais) prior to professionalize in 2006, within the regional daily La Dépêche du Midi.

Articles

Historical
 "La France du repli, 1940 : refuge et solidarité", Migrance, hors-série sous la direction de Max Lagarrigue, Paris, 2000.
 "L’affaire du Fau (mai 1944-1952)", Montauban, Arkheia, 2000.
 "Itinéraire d’un cadre en marge : Renaud Jean, 1939-1941", Communisme (CNRS), Paris, Éditions de L'Âge d’Homme, 1999.
 "Un communisme rural ? L’exemple lot-et-garonnais durant les années trente", Éditions les Amis du Vieux Nérac, Toulouse, 1998.
 "Le PCF dans le Sud-Ouest : Centre et Périphérie", Communisme (CNRS), Paris, L'Age d’Homme, 1998.
 "Le PCF de la France rurale des années trente à la Guerre froide (1930-1961) : l’exemple du Sud-ouest", Revue des Archives en Limousin, n° 12, Brive, 1998.
 "La Confédération paysanne des Paysans Travailleurs (CGPT). Émergences, actions et difficultés d’une syndicalisme de 'classe' dans les années trente", Le Festin, n° 25, Bordeaux, 1998.

Opinion, politics
Les causes noires (Causes black),revue Le Meilleur des mondes, n° 2, Denoël, 2007.
 D'un totalitarisme à un autre...Les liaisons dangereuses de la Ligue des Droits de l'homme (LDH) (On totalitarianism to another ... The dangerous liaisons of the League of Human Rights), revue Le Meilleur des mondes, Denoël, n° 1, 2006.
 Pauvre Voltaire: le cas Thierry Meyssan (Poor Voltaire: the case Thierry Meyssan), revue Le Meilleur des mondes, Denoël, n° 1, 2006.

Books 
 99 questions… La France sous l’Occupation, Montpellier, CNDP, octobre 2007 
 1940, la Belgique du repli. L’histoire d’une petite Belgique dans le Sud-Ouest de la France, Charleroi, Éditions du Hainaut, 2005 
 Toulouse et sa région, Guide bleu Hachette, 2004
 Renaud Jean. Carnets d’un paysan député communiste, Biarritz, Atlantica, 531 p, 2001 
 (dir.), 1940. La France du repli : l’Europe de la défaite, Toulouse, Privat, 2001, 384 p

References

French journalists
21st-century French historians
Living people
French male non-fiction writers
Year of birth missing (living people)
People from Tarn-et-Garonne